Cuba is a ghost town in Lafayette County, in the U.S. state of Missouri.

Cuba was founded by a colony of African Americans, whose skin color was likened to that of Cubans, hence the name.

References

Ghost towns in Missouri
Former populated places in Lafayette County, Missouri